The 2018 NHK Trophy was the fourth event of six in the 2018–19 ISU Grand Prix of Figure Skating, a senior-level international invitational competition series. It was held at Hiroshima Green Arena in Hiroshima on November 9–11. Medals were awarded in the disciplines of men's singles, ladies' singles, pair skating, and ice dancing. Skaters also earned points toward qualifying for the 2018–19 Grand Prix Final.

Entries
The ISU published the preliminary assignments on June 29, 2018.

Changes to preliminary assignments

Results

Men

Ladies

Pairs

Ice dancing

References

External links
 2018 NHK Trophy at the International Skating Union
 Entry orders and results

NHK Trophy
NHK Trophy
NHK Trophy
NHK Trophy